
Gmina Tarnawatka is a rural gmina (administrative district) in Tomaszów Lubelski County, Lublin Voivodeship, in eastern Poland.

Villages
Gmina Tarnawatka contains the villages and settlements of Dąbrowa Tarnawacka, Górka, Gromada, Hatczyska, Hatczyska-Kolonia, Huta Tarnawacka, Kaliszaki, Klocówka, Kocia Wólka, Kolonia Klocówka, Kunówka, Łanowe Sołtysy, Niemirówek, Niemirówek-Kolonia, Pańków, Pauczne, Petrynówka, Podhucie, Pucharki, Skrzypny Ostrów, Sumin, Suminek, Tarnawatka, Tarnawatka-Tartak, Tymin, Wieprzów Ordynacki, Wieprzów Tarnawacki and Zaolzie.

Neighbouring gminas
Gmina Tarnawatka is bordered by the gminas of Krasnobród, Krynice, Rachanie and Tomaszów Lubelski.

References

Polish official population figures 2006

Tarnawatka
Tomaszów Lubelski County